Spaced is a British television situation comedy written by and starring Simon Pegg and Jessica Stevenson, and directed by Edgar Wright. Two series of seven episodes were broadcast in 1999 and 2001 on Channel 4. Listed below are major and minor characters that appear in the two series.

Main characters

Tim Bisley (played by Simon Pegg): Tim, rarely seen without his skateboard, his Chocolate beanie, or his PlayStation controller, is an aspiring comic book artist, amateur skateboarder, and avid follower of cult fiction in many forms, including video games, science fiction, and especially - at least initially - the original Star Wars trilogy. He is a rather pessimistic and hot-headed lad, quick to anger at the slightest provocation, mostly because his girlfriend, Sarah (played by Anna Wilson-Jones), broke his heart and dumped him after an affair with Tim's friend - Duane Benzie (played by Peter Serafinowicz), but he can also be sincerely empathetic and supportive, for example, defending the more timid Brian when Tim feels Brian is being unfairly criticised. He's currently writing and illustrating a graphic novel about an orphaned boy who has been inadvertently transformed into a giant mutant bear from the experiments of the crazed "Doktor Mandrake", who now is trying to find this bear so that he can replicate the experiment which transformed the boy. Tim hasn't actually tried selling his work, because he's afraid that people will laugh at both it and him, as shown by flashbacks in-show of an evil-looking man (who is later found to be Damien Knox, editor of Darkstar Comics) laughing at Tim's work. A traumatic incident in his childhood when attempting to cure a fear of dogs merely left him terrified of dogs, lightning and bamboo instead.  He initially works as an assistant manager at a comic book shop, "Fantasy Bazaar", alongside its manager/owner, Bilbo Bagshot (played by Bill Bailey). In the second series, he lands his dream job as a graphic artist at Dark Star Comics thanks to Sophie. Tim consistently demonstrates more of a work ethic than Daisy, although his adverse reaction to Twiglets makes him violent. Tim's name is a reference to renowned 2000 AD comic artist, Simon Bisley.
Daisy Steiner (played by Jessica Stevenson): Daisy is an aspiring writer, although she tends to spend most of her time actively avoiding doing any writing - or any other actual work for that matter. Whereas Tim is often fiery and impatient, Daisy is optimistic, enthusiastic and happy-go-lucky, and at times overwhelmingly so. She can also be aggressive and intimidating at times, as demonstrated when she joined an employment agency only to lose most of the jobs she was assigned through her negative attitudes. She considers herself to be quite intellectual, even though she only graduated from Kingston University with a third class degree. She has a tendency to babble in conversation, making social interactions rather more difficult to navigate than they necessarily have to be. She also has a tendency to interfere in other people's problems or lives as a way of avoiding focusing on her work or her own problems. Daisy bestows most of her love  upon her dog Colin, a Miniature Schnauzer, whom she rescues from being put down. Daisy also possesses a natural talent for martial arts, although this is seldom called into use. Her greatest desire was to go to India and see the Taj Mahal, a goal which she accomplished between series one and two after having actually published some articles for a change (her trip was also aided by inheritance money from her deceased aunt).
Marsha Klein (played by Julia Deakin): Marsha, the alcoholic landlady, is never seen without a lit cigarette in one hand, and a glass of red wine in the other. Once a promising young athlete, she retired from athletics after receiving a leg injury and became a groupie instead, resulting in several marriages that ended badly and a teenage daughter, Amber, with whom she is near-constantly arguing. She passionately lusts after Brian, an attraction which stems from a vague, presumptuous incident in the past where rent negotiations became somewhat more sensual than usual as a result of Brian's sheer poverty. She is genuinely excited to have new, young friends, which is slightly awkward, as she's the only one who does not know that Tim and Daisy are not actually a couple.
Brian Topp (played by Mark Heap): The lodger in the flat below Tim and Daisy's, Brian is a rather mysterious and somewhat angst-ridden and enthusiastic artist. Soft-spoken and intense, Brian gives the impression of being almost psychotic and sociopathic; in-fact, he's just very shy and socially awkward. His main artistic drives are anger, pain, fear and aggression, and his art is, according to him, 'a bit more complex' than watercolours. Both his artistic drives and his social anxiety can be traced to the death of his childhood pet dog Pom Pom, run over by a van when playing with Brian (who used to dress him up in period costumes and photograph him). He frequently behaves in a tormented fashion, particularly when Marsha's lusting after him. He is in love with Twist, and embarked on a troublesome relationship with her before they broke up towards the end of series two. Despite this, his sexuality is quite complex and frequently alluded to throughout the series, as he seems quite undecided at times. When directly asked if he's gay he replies that he is not, but in a manner that suggests he thinks he ought to be. At the start of the first series, he has a strong dislike of contemporary art, but is quite talented in its use, and by the end of the second series he overcomes his disregard and proudly displays his abstract portrait of Twist in public. The character of Brian was originally written for Julian Barratt, who had previously worked with Wright, Pegg and Stevenson in their previous series Asylum. Barratt was unable to play the role so Mark Heap was cast instead.
Mike Watt (played by Nick Frost): Mike is Tim's best friend. He wishes dearly that he could join the British Army, but unfortunately is ineligible owing to the detached retinas he received following a painful childhood accident when jumping from a tree after being encouraged by Tim, and as such must console himself with membership in the Territorial Army instead. The first series revealed that Mike had been thrown out of the TA because he stole a Chieftain tank and tried to invade Paris with it while on weekend manoeuvres in France. At a readmission hearing, it is revealed that Mike's invasion plan failed because he stopped at Euro Disney and was apprehended on Space Mountain. Mike is granted readmission by the end of the first series however, and even advanced to the rank of sergeant during the second series. Mike is a weapons expert and is obsessed with military order, protocol and lifestyle. He is always armed, usually with several automatic or semi-automatic firearms, and also sometimes grenades or even landmines. He rarely dresses without full DPM clothing and a military beret. He uses walkie-talkies as cell phones and only uses military time — he does not understand times given to him from the 12-hour clock. He snores in weapons and explosives noises. Mike is very protective of Tim, and subtle suggestions over the course of the series indicate that Mike may have a slight crush on him (evident in such 'subtle' indications as Tim and himself holding hands at the start of some scenes, most obviously in the Paintball episode: their hands are parted by a tree). Despite his military pretensions, Mike is an innocent and friendly individual who is deeply hurt by being put aside in favour of Tim's growing relationship with Sophie and that his best friend won't spend any time with him any more in series two. The character was based on a recurring joke between Simon Pegg and Nick Frost (who are best friends outside of the series). When writing Spaced, Pegg included the character and persuaded Edgar Wright to cast Frost.
Twist Morgan (played by Katy Carmichael): Twist, Daisy's best friend, is (in the words of Tim) either 'sweet and stupid, or an evil genius'. She 'works in fashion' (i.e. a dry cleaner) and is an atrociously superficial 'fashion fascist'. She is prone to giving backhanded compliments to Daisy, particularly about her size, weight or clothing choices. It is never mentioned in the series how Daisy and Twist met, though various extras on the DVD boxset state that they met at university. Although she and Brian are social opposites with apparently incompatible fashion sense, they did have an intense love affair, mainly based on sex, which ended badly. It is alluded though that they both still love each other.
Colin (played by Ada the Dog): Colin is Daisy's dog, a Miniature Schnauzer, bought from a dogs' home where he was shortly due to be put down, to cheer Daisy up after she is dumped by her boyfriend Richard. He is named after the cardboard box Daisy played with as a child when she wasn't allowed to have a real dog. In the first series, Colin is abducted by an evil "freelance vivisectionist" and held at an animal testing facility. Despite his initial mortal fear of dogs, Tim eventually manages to bond with Colin by this time, so he leads Mike, Brian, Daisy, and Twist on a rescue mission to get him back home. In the second series, after Daisy has returned from her travels in Asia, it is clear that Colin feels rejected by her.  In the final episode she discovers that he has been running off for secret visits with an elderly - and rather sinister - lady from the neighbourhood. Daisy manages to retrieve Colin but, remembering the countless times he has been neglected and the promise of widescreen TV, he runs off again. However, when the old lady suggests changing Colin's name to Lancelot he returns to Daisy to play happy families with her and Tim. He has the ability to tilt his head sideways, thus prompting anyone who sees this to sigh at his cuteness. In real life, Colin is actually a female named Ada (although this is incorrectly spelt as 'Aida' on the credits). A comment made by Nick Frost during filming of a scene with Ada about dogs being unable to look up is referred to in the comedy film Shaun of the Dead (one of the myriad references to  Spaced  in the film).

Recurring characters
Sarah (played by Anna Wilson-Jones): Sarah is the ex-girlfriend who broke Tim's heart by leaving him for his friend, Duane, and kicking him out of their flat. Sarah is a rather cruel person, feeding her own vanity with Tim's humiliating attempts to win her back, while, at the same time, constantly ignoring him. She later wants to reconcile with Tim but he realizes that it is best for him to move on. She subsequently gets back with Duane.
Richard (played by James Lance): Daisy's boyfriend. Their pet names for each other are "Daisy Duke" and "Boss Hogg". They are in a long-distance relationship (he lives in Hull) but he later breaks up with her over the phone after she confesses to having cheated on him.
Duane Benzie (played by Peter Serafinowicz): The arrogant and intimidating gravelly-voiced back stabber who stole Sarah away from Tim. He was Sarah's boss and Tim's close friend until Tim learned of their affair. In the episode "Battles", Tim gets his revenge by shooting Duane in the testicles at close range in a paintball game. In "Gone", episode 5 of series 2, he steals Tim's keys in an attempt to exact revenge on him, only to end up colliding with a gang of young hooligans in his prized Mazda MX-5, after which they proceed to beat him up.
Amber Klein (played by Theo Park and voiced by Jessica Stevenson): Marsha's bratty teenage daughter. She and her mother constantly argue and the arguments always end with Amber storming out of the house. The sound of Amber leaving becomes a cue to Tim and Daisy that Marsha will come by wanting to talk. Amber's face is never seen (although it is briefly shown in an extremely blurred photograph in a deleted scene). Marsha has called her "The Devil in an A-cup" (in the first series) and "Duchess of the D-grade" (in the second series), among other things. In Episode 2 of Series 2, Amber finally moves out of 23 Meteor Street, because of rising tension between Amber and Marsha.
Tyres O'Flaherty (played by Michael Smiley): A  Northern Irish bike messenger and a friend of Tim and Mike's. He is a raver and everyday noises such as a phone ringing, or a car horn honking, sound like rave music to him, often prompting him to start dancing. His raving (and presumed accompanying drug intake) also makes him prone to hair-trigger mood swings. Tyres possesses a very short attention span and is easily distracted. He suspects Tim and Daisy are more than "just friends" and always refers to the two of them as such, with air quotes. He is also very proud of being part of the work force, more than once putting down both Tim and Daisy (insulting them because of their career choices; and when Daisy tells him she is signing on).  A zombie version of Tyres appears very briefly (still dancing) in Shaun of the Dead.
Bilbo Bagshot (played by Bill Bailey): Tim's boss at the comic book store, "Fantasy Bazaar". He explains to Tim the story of Gramsci, the dog that attacks only the rich people on Hampstead Heath. He is a father figure for Tim. At one point in series 2, Bilbo fires Tim for his inability to get over his dislike of The Phantom Menace, but later begs him to return, inspired by Tim leaving a message begging him to do so on his answer-phone. He once beat up his dad for saying Hawk the Slayer was rubbish.
Damien Knox (played by Clive Russell): The head of Dark Star Comics, the company that Tim desperately longs to work for. When Tim first submitted his portfolio, Damien laughed him out of the office. Since then, Tim has been haunted by visions of Damien laughing at him, and is afraid of submitting a new portfolio to him. When he sees Tim's work again, he is very impressed. In the DVD commentary, it is revealed that Damien is based on Herr Starr from Preacher.
Sophie (played by Lucy Akhurst): Damien's beautiful assistant who helps Tim get hired at Dark Star. They immediately begin dating and have a fun relationship, provoking jealousy in both Daisy and Mike. In the last episode of series 2, she gets a job offer at Marvel Comics in the American city of Seattle, and must move away.
Dexter and Cromwell (played by Reece Shearsmith and Jonathan Ryland): Mike's rivals in the TA. They destroy Mike and Tim's combat robot in an effort to take their place in Robot Wars - but eventually have to settle it at the shadowy underground community "Robot Club" (a reference to Fight Club). Later, Mike earns the rank of sergeant and becomes their superior. In the final episode of the series, they are compelled to assist in Mike's 'bloody spectacular idea' to convince Marsha not to sell the house. Dexter's name and his snide persona is a pun of Sinister Dexter.

References

External links
Spaced Out - official, fan-operated website

Spaced
Spaced